Qarah Aghaj (also Romanized as Qarah Āghāj; also known as Qareh Āqāj) is a village in Abharrud Rural District, in the Central District of Abhar County, Zanjan Province, Iran. At the 2006 census, its population was 99, in 18 families.

References 

Populated places in Abhar County